Bandar-e Anzali (also Romanized as Bandar-e Anzalī; renamed as Bandar-e Pahlavi during the Pahlavi dynasty) is a city of Gilan Province, Iran. At the 2016 census, its population was 118,564.

Anzali is one of the most important cities in Iran in terms of tourism, economics, and athletics. Bandar-e Anzali is the biggest Gilaki speaking city in the world after Rasht, the capital of Gilan province. The city was home to the first and biggest port on the southern shores of the Caspian Sea. Bandar-e Anzali consists of an island called Mianposhteh and the surrounding lands. Tourist attractions include a clock tower called Manareh, the long harbour promenade, and the water-logged delta and beach along the Sefid Rud.

History 
Anzali is an old city in ancient Iran, first settled by the Cadusii. Owing to their pleasant relationship with Cyrus the Great, King of Anshan (Persia), and their military cooperation in Cyrus's founding of the Achaemenid Empire, the Cadusii adopted the name Anshan-e Pars (Ανσνάν in Greek), meaning "the Anshans of Persia".

This word in Middle Persian is Anzalag; a variant Persian form is Anzalazh. Anzali Gulf was a safe harbour for trade ships and fishing boats. It was renamed to Pahlavi in 1935.

In 1919, with the collapse of General Anton Denikin's White Russian army, eighteen of his ships sought refuge in Anzali. On 18 May 1920, a Soviet flotilla of thirteen ships launched a surprise attack on Anzali, capturing the British garrison and the eighteen White Russian ships. This allowed for the establishment of the short-lived Persian Socialist Republic and the Persian Communist Party. Soviet authorities denied responsibility for the attack, blaming the local Russian naval commander for attacking under his own authority.

Its wonderful lagoon, Customs and City Hall edifice (Shahrdari), Mian Poshte Palace, and Motamedi Edifice are its tourist attractions. Anzali was the site of the Caspian University of Naval Science until 1980, when it was moved to Nowshahr. Naser-al-din Shah's Shams-ol-Emareh tower (not to be confused with the Tehran building of the same name) was built by Moayer al Mamalek. The famous Sangi Bath was destroyed by people and natural factors.

The Sangi Bath was noted for its marvelous durable system of basins with heated water. Some groups think that Motamedi Edifice had been changed; it is now its police office. This Ghajar Structure built in two floors with the help of Mirza Abd-ol-Vahab.

Geography
 
The Anzali Lagoon divides the Anzali Port in two parts. The city is connected by two bridges to the Beheshti Island. There is a caviar processing factory in Bandar-e Anzali, some old ruins from 19th century and the popular Shanbeh Bazaar. Tourbebar is a village about 40 kilometers from Bandar-e Anzali, near the Anzali Lagoon.

Demographics 
Historically Anzalis were mostly involved in the fish trade. Rice farming and agriculture are the other traditional jobs in Anzali, and are practiced in the villages surrounding the city.

The majority of Anzalis are adherents of Shia Islam, although there is a sizeable Armenian Christian minority.

The people of Anzali speak Gilaki as their mother language and Persian as the national language.
Specific Anzali Accent of Western Gilaki language is the main language of Anzali.

Language 
Linguistic composition of the city.

Climate
Bandar-e Anzali has a humid subtropical climate (Cfa) under the Köppen climate classification and humid subtropical climate (Cf) under the Trewartha climate classification, with warm, humid summers and cool, damp winters. It has the most humid climate of any city in Iran, similar in its heavy autumn and early winter rainfall, persistent high humidity and low sunshine to the Sea of Japan coast of Japan, though it receives much less summer rainfall than that region. The warm and humid weather has allowed this region to grow crops such as rice and tea that require very large amounts of moisture, especially with the extra water draining from the Elburz Mountains.

Caviar
Bandar-e Anzali is a center of caviar production. The preparation and marketing of which is a state monopoly, handled through the Iranian Fishing Company under the control of the Finance Ministry. The public is not admitted to the immense refrigerated hangars where tons of sturgeons, some as large as 3 meters long and weighing 100 kilograms, are stored after the removal of the caviar, usually equivalent to about one tenth of their weight.

Sports

The most popular sport in Anzali is football, and the city is known as a football hub in Iran. Malavan, one of the most famous teams in Iran, is the main team of the city, and they currently play in the second tier Azadegan League. Current and former national team players such as Sirous Ghayeghran, Saeid Ezatolahi, Mohammad Mayeli Kohan, Jalal Hosseini, Maziar Zare, Mohammad Gholami, Jalal Rafkhaei, and Sosha Makani are from Anzali.

Gallery

See also

 Nezla

References

External links

 Official website
 www.anzaliport.ir
 Anzali News

Populated places in Bandar-e Anzali County
Cities in Gilan Province
Port cities and towns in Iran
Populated places on the Caspian Sea
Azerbaijani settlements in Gilan Province
Gilak settlements in Gilan Province